Ponnapuram Kottayil Kelu Moopan Also known as Punnapuram kottayil kelu Moopan or Kelu Moopan Chekon is a warrior who lived in the 17th century. He belonged to a Tiyyar caste, The chief who was a character in the Vadakkan Pattukal, Another theme in northern Malabar songs is an important character in Wayanad. Thacholi lived during the time of Othenan.  In the Vadakkan Pattukal, Thacholi Othenan kills the elder Kelu. In Thacholi song, the Kanni is taken away by the elder Kelu, and the moopan is killed by Thacholi Othenan who saved the virgin. After that, the fort administration gives the charge to Kunjikelu. The theme of one of the ballads is the massive fortress of Kelumooppan, a prominent warlord of Ponnapuram. He had a personal body-guard of 16 swordsmen and 22 Nairs and his palanquin bearers were also Nairs. The fortress was built with huge rubble blocks and had 90 doors which could automatically be closed when a string was pulled. Around the fortress there were seven moats each connected with an iron bridge.

References

Wayanad district
Thiyyar warriors